McMaster Children's Hospital (MCH), in Hamilton, Ontario, is one of Canada's largest pediatric academic tertiary care teaching hospitals affiliated with McMaster University. It is operated by Hamilton Health Sciences and is within the McMaster University Medical Centre. MCH became a children's hospital in 1988. The hospital was recently ranked 2nd in Canada for research according to Research Infosource Inc.

In 2017, the hospital opened a new clinic for dialysis.

The Neonatal Intensive Care Unit (NICU), with 63 beds, provides specialized care for newborns and infants with certain conditions that benefit from intensive care.

References

External links 
McMaster Children's Hospital Website
McMaster University Department of Pediatrics
McMaster Children's Hospital (Foundation)

Gallery 

1988 establishments in Ontario
McMaster University
Hospitals in Hamilton, Ontario
Hospitals established in 1988
Children's hospitals in Canada